The  Generalized Additive Model for Location, Scale and Shape (GAMLSS)  is an approach to statistical modelling and learning. GAMLSS is a modern distribution-based approach to (semiparametric) regression. A parametric distribution is assumed for the response (target) variable but the parameters of this distribution can vary according to explanatory variables using linear, nonlinear or smooth functions. In machine learning parlance, GAMLSS is a form of supervised machine learning.

In particular, the GAMLSS statistical framework enables flexible regression and smoothing models to be fitted to the data. The GAMLSS model assumes the response variable has any parametric distribution which might be heavy or light-tailed, and positively or negatively skewed. In addition, all the parameters of the distribution [location (e.g., mean), scale (e.g., variance) and shape (skewness and kurtosis)] can be modeled as linear, nonlinear or smooth functions of explanatory variables.

Overview of the model
The generalized additive model for location, scale and shape (GAMLSS) is a statistical model developed by Rigby and Stasinopoulos (and later expanded) to overcome some of the limitations associated with the popular generalized linear models (GLMs) and generalized additive models (GAMs). For an overview of these limitations see Nelder and Wedderburn (1972) and Hastie's and Tibshirani's book.

In GAMLSS the exponential family distribution assumption for the response variable,, (essential in GLMs and GAMs), is relaxed and replaced by a general distribution family, including highly skew and/or kurtotic continuous and discrete distributions.

The systematic part of the model is expanded to allow modeling not only of the mean (or location) but other parameters of the distribution of y as linear and/or nonlinear, parametric and/or additive non-parametric functions of explanatory variables and/or random effects.

GAMLSS is especially suited for modelling a leptokurtic or platykurtic and/or positively or negatively skewed response variable. For count type response variable data it deals with over-dispersion by using proper over-dispersed discrete distributions. Heterogeneity also is dealt with by modeling the scale or shape parameters using explanatory variables. There are several packages written in R related to GAMLSS models,  and tutorials for using and interpreting GAMLSS.

A GAMLSS model assumes independent observations  for 
with probability (density) function  conditional on  a vector of four distribution parameters, each of which can be a function of the explanatory variables.

 

For centile estimation the WHO Multicentre Growth Reference Study Group have recommended GAMLSS and the Box–Cox power exponential (BCPE) distributions for the construction of the WHO Child Growth Standards.

What distributions can be used

The form of the distribution assumed for the response variable y, is very general. For example, an implementation of GAMLSS in R has around 100 different distributions available. Such implementations also allow use of truncated distributions and censored (or interval) response variables.

References

Further reading

 
 Cole, T. J., Stanojevic, S., Stocks, J., Coates, A. L., Hankinson, J. L., Wade, A. M. (2009), "Age- and size-related reference ranges: A case study of spirometry through childhood and adulthood", Statistics in Medicine, 28(5), 880–898.Link
 Fenske, N., Fahrmeir, L., Rzehak, P., Hohle, M. (25 September 2008), "Detection of risk factors for obesity in early childhood with quantile regression methods for longitudinal data", Department of Statistics: Technical Reports, No.38 Link
 Hudson, I. L., Kim, S. W., Keatley, M. R.  (2010), "Climatic Influences on the Flowering Phenology of Four Eucalypts: A GAMLSS Approach Phenological Research". In Phenological Research, Irene L. Hudson and Marie R. Keatley (eds), Springer Netherlands Link
 Hudson, I. L., Rea, A., Dalrymple, M. L., Eilers, P. H. C. (2008), "Climate impacts on sudden infant death syndrome: a GAMLSS approach", Proceedings of the 23rd international workshop on statistical modelling pp. 277–280. Link
 
 
 
 Serinaldi, F., Villarini, G., Smith, J. A., Krajewski, W. F. (2008), "Change-Point and Trend Analysis on Annual Maximum Discharge in Continental United States", American Geophysical Union Fall Meeting 2008, abstract #H21A-0803*

External links
GAMLSS official website gamlss.org
GAMLSS manual  (downloadable)
Distribution tables in GAMLSS
The GAMLSS packages reference card (downloadable)
The booklet for the Utrecht short course on GAMLSS (downloadable)
R packages for GAMLSS on CRAN

Additive model for location, scale and shape
Semi-parametric models